Luiz Carlos Sarolli (8 March 1965 – 28 November 2016), known as Caio Júnior or Caio Jr., was a Brazilian football forward and coach.

He spent his 14-year professional career in Brazil and Portugal, notably amassing Primeira Liga totals of 140 games and 31 goals in the latter nation in representation of three teams, mainly Vitória de Guimarães.

Caio Júnior started working as a manager in 2002, going on to be in charge of a host of clubs. In 2016, whilst at the service of Chapecoense, he died in an aviation incident in Colombia.

Playing career
Born in Cascavel, Paraná, Caio Júnior's Série A input consisted of 37 games and nine goals combined for Grêmio Foot-Ball Porto Alegrense, Sport Club Internacional and Paraná Clube, during four seasons. in 1987 he moved to Portugal where he would remain for the next eight years, starting out at Vitória S.C. in the Minho Province.

Caio Júnior made his debut in the Primeira Liga on 23 August 1987, coming on as a 67th-minute substitute in a 2–2 away draw against Varzim SC. He finished his first season with eight goals from 31 appearances, helping his team to the 14th place as well as the third round of the UEFA Cup.

Having returned to his homeland at the age of 31, and with the exception of Paraná in 1997, Caio Júnior competed exclusively in the lower leagues until his retirement.

Coaching career
On 27 February 2014, Caio Júnior was appointed coach of Criciúma Esporte Clube. In June of that year he returned to the UAE Arabian Gulf League, after signing for Al Shabab (Dubai) in the same capacity.

Caio Júnior reached Associação Chapecoense de Futebol on 25 June 2016. He took the team to the final of the Copa Sudamericana, after disposing of Argentina's San Lorenzo de Almagro on the away goals rule.

Death
On 28 November 2016, whilst travelling with Chapecoense to the aforementioned finals, 51-year-old Caio Júnior was among the fatalities of the LaMia Flight 2933 accident in the Colombian village of Cerro Gordo, La Unión, Antioquia. Shortly after having reached the decisive match in the competition, he uttered: "If I died tomorrow I'd die a happy man".

Honours

Player
Grêmio
Campeonato Gaúcho: 1985, 1986, 1987

Vitória Guimarães
Supertaça Cândido de Oliveira: 1988

Estrela Amadora
Segunda Liga: 1992–93

Internacional
Campeonato Gaúcho: 1994

Paraná
Campeonato Paranaense: 1997

Individual
Campeonato Gaúcho: Top Scorer 1985 (15 goals)

Coach
Al-Gharafa
Qatar Stars League: 2009–10
Qatari Stars Cup: 2009

Al-Jazira
UAE President's Cup: 2012

Vitória
Campeonato Baiano: 2013

Chapecoense
Copa Sudamericana: 2016 (posthumously)

Managerial statistics

References

External links

 

1965 births
2016 deaths
People from Cascavel
Brazilian people of Italian descent
Brazilian footballers
Association football forwards
Campeonato Brasileiro Série A players
Campeonato Brasileiro Série B players
Grêmio Foot-Ball Porto Alegrense players
Sport Club Internacional players
Esporte Clube Novo Hamburgo players
Paraná Clube players
Esporte Clube XV de Novembro (Piracicaba) players
Paulista Futebol Clube players
Iraty Sport Club players
Rio Branco Esporte Clube players
Primeira Liga players
Vitória S.C. players
C.F. Estrela da Amadora players
C.F. Os Belenenses players
Brazilian expatriate footballers
Expatriate footballers in Portugal
Brazilian expatriate sportspeople in Portugal
Brazilian football managers
Campeonato Brasileiro Série A managers
Campeonato Brasileiro Série B managers
Paraná Clube managers
Cianorte Futebol Clube managers
Londrina Esporte Clube managers
Esporte Clube Juventude managers
Sociedade Esportiva do Gama managers
Sociedade Esportiva Palmeiras managers
Goiás Esporte Clube managers
CR Flamengo managers
Botafogo de Futebol e Regatas managers
Grêmio Foot-Ball Porto Alegrense managers
Esporte Clube Bahia managers
Esporte Clube Vitória managers
Criciúma Esporte Clube managers
Associação Chapecoense de Futebol managers
J1 League managers
Vissel Kobe managers
Al-Gharafa SC managers
UAE Pro League managers
Al Jazira Club managers
Al Shabab Al Arabi Club managers
Brazilian expatriate football managers
Expatriate football managers in Japan
Expatriate football managers in Qatar
Expatriate football managers in the United Arab Emirates
Victims of the LaMia Flight 2933 crash
Footballers killed in the LaMia Flight 2933 crash
Brazilian expatriate sportspeople in Japan
Brazilian expatriate sportspeople in Qatar
Brazilian expatriate sportspeople in the United Arab Emirates
Sportspeople from Paraná (state)